The Centaurides (Kentaurides) or centauresses are female centaurs. First encountered in Greek mythology as members of the tribe of the Centauroi, the Centaurides are only occasionally mentioned in written sources, but appear frequently in Greek art and Roman mosaics. The centauress who appears most frequently in literature is Hylonome, wife of the centaur Cyllarus.

Names
As a proper noun, Centauride or Kentauride refers specifically to a female of the tribe of the Centauroi or Kentauroi (Κένταυροι), commonly rendered in English as the common noun "centaurs"; as a common noun, centauride refers to any female centaur.  Centauress is the more usual term in English, but centaurelle and centaurette may also occur.

Literary depictions
In the "Imagines", the rhetorician Philostratus the Elder gives a brief description of the Centaurides:

In the "Metamorphoses", Ovid gives a brief description of Hylonome:

Shakespeare refers to centauresses in King Lear, Act IV, Scene VI, lines 124–125:
"Down from the waist they're centaurs,
Though women all above".

Other appearances

A British family named Lambert used a female centaur holding a rose in her left hand as a heraldic device, and depicted this figure in their monuments. However, they were unable to establish official authority for these arms, and in the eighteenth century changed them to a male centaur holding a bow.

In Walt Disney's film Fantasia, Beethoven's Pastoral Symphony is illustrated with scenes from Greek mythology, in which male and female centaurs, referred to by the studio as "centaurettes", feature prominently.  The centaurettes appear in various situations, some of which depict them affecting the mannerisms of fashionable women in 1940.  The centaurettes are shown in a variety of colours other than human skin tones, including blue, and were originally drawn bare-breasted, but applying the Hays code, the Motion Picture Producers and Distributors of America forced the animators to cover their breasts with garlands.  Changing attitudes toward racial stereotypes in the 1960s led to the cutting of scenes depicting black centaurettes waiting on the others.

The song Witch Of The Westmoreland, originally sung by Barbara Dickson on the folk album From The Beggar's Mantle, features a benevolent witch, described in the song as "[o]ne half the form of a maiden fair/And a jet-black mare's body."

Since the late 2000s, as a part of the monster girl trend in Japan, female centaurs have appeared in several Japanese anime and manga such as Monster Musume and A Centaur's Life.

See also 
Anggitay

References

External links 
 Theoi Project - Kentaurides

Centaurs
Female legendary creatures